Amanita beckeri or Becker's ringless amanita is a species of Amanita from Europe. It is named after Georges Becker (1905-1994), who identified it.

References

External links
 
 

beckeri